Pelaw Grange Stadium is a Greyhound Board of Great Britain regulated greyhound racing track located at North Lodge in the English county of Durham, between Chester-le-Street and Gateshead. The stadium has a restaurant and a number of bars and has been owned by the McKenna family since January 1965.

Racing takes place every Friday and Saturday night as well as Sunday evenings.

Origins and opening 

A greyhound track situated north of Chester-le-Street was constructed and named after Pelaw Grange a nearby country house and farm directly to the east. It was reportedly built in 1944* by a man called George Towers to the south of Drum Road and directly next to the railway with the back straight running parallel to the east side of the railway. It served the local population in the area with independent racing (unlicensed). The entire area was a hot bed of greyhound racing with links to the mining communities that lived in the county of Durham. It is also believed that there was a larger greyhound stadium just to the north in Birtley. 

The stadium was taken over by Joe and Joyce McKenna in January 1965 racing every Thursday and Saturday. The racing consisted of level and handicap races over distances of 241, 410 & 570 yards with an inside hare. The McKenna’s son Jeff eventually became the track promoter and he continued to offer independent racing taking the role of General and Racing Manager combined. Facilities improved over the years with the 360y circumference track becoming all-sand in the eighties. Competitions were introduced called the Newcastle Rose Bowl & Whitfield Oaks. There was computerised tote, car parking for 200 vehicles, three bars and two glass fronted stands.

Licensed racing
In 2005 Jeff McKenna and his wife Theresa changed over to race under rules after sixty years as an independent track. The application to the National Greyhound Racing Club was passed and the switchover took place on Monday 22 August with the first racing on the Thursday 25th 2005. 

The track installed Graeme Henigan as Racing Manager and there was also success from local trainers in National competitions including a National Sprint title for Clounlaheen trained by Mick Hurst. The track today runs every Friday, Saturday and Sunday lunchtime with the current Racing Manager being David Gray. The track celebrated fifty years under the McKenna’s in August 2015 by hosting a Sky Sports television fixture for the first time featuring a meeting sponsored by Pin Point Recruitment. 

In 2018 the stadium signed a deal with ARC to race every Sunday evening. In 2021, Jaguar Macie trained by Pelaw Grange attached Graham Rankin won the Ladbrokes Puppy Derby and the Northern Puppy Derby.

Track records

Current

Former

References

External links
 Official site

Greyhound racing venues in the United Kingdom